Diego de Almagro Island (Spanish: Isla Diego de Almagro), formerly known as Cambridge Island, is an island in the Magallanes Region, Chile. It is located South-West of Hanover Island. It is named after Diego de Almagro.

See also
 List of islands of Chile

External links
 Video Report in The Guardian about Caves network discovered under island off Chile
 Islands of Chile @ United Nations Environment Programme
 World island information @ WorldIslandInfo.com
 South America Island High Points above 1000 meters
 United States Hydrographic Office, South America Pilot (1916)

Islands of Magallanes Region